Uganda Export Promotion Board (UEPB) is a public trade promotion organization established by Parliamentary Statute No. 2 of 1996. At the time of formation, it was known as the Uganda Export Promotion Council (UEPC). It is an agency that is regulated and supervised by the Uganda Ministry of Trade, Industry and Cooperatives. The fundamental role of this institution is to facilitate the development and growth of export trade in Uganda.

Location
As of August 2017, UEPB maintains its headquarters and only office at: 2nd Floor, UEDCL Tower, 37 Nakasero Road, Kampala, Uganda. The geographical coordinates of Uganda Export Promotion Board headquarters are:0°19'34.5"N, 32°34'37.5"E (Latitude:0.326250; Longitude:32.577083).

Administration 
This institution is administered by a board of directors that drawn from government ministries, related public and private trade support institutions and major export sector associations. These include the Ministry of Finance, Ministry of Trade, Industry and Cooperatives,  Ministry of Foreign Affairs; Uganda Investment Authority (UIA), Uganda National Chamber of Commerce and Industry (UNCCI); Uganda National Farmers Federation, Uganda Flower Exporter Association plus other private sector players. In total there are 12 members.

Operations 
The institution is technically headed by an Executive Director. It is organized into three operational divisions: (a) Market Research and Product Development, (b)Management Information Systems, Trade Promotions and Public Relations and (3) the Finance and Administration Division. Each of these three divisions is headed by a divisional director and has at least three desk officers.

President's Export Award
The UEPB has an annual event; the "President's Export Award", which acknowledges the export fraternity's contribution towards the economic development of the country. The President has always been the chief host and guest at this annual event.

See also
 Uganda Investment Authority
 Parliament of Uganda

References

External links
 Uganda Export Promotion Board
 UEPB welcomes the new Ag. Executive Director
 

Government agencies of Uganda
Organizations established in 1996
Organisations based in Kampala
1996 establishments in Uganda
Export promotion agencies
Foreign trade of Uganda